The Quito Challenger is a tennis tournament held in Quito, Ecuador since 1995. The event is part of the ATP Challenger Tour and is played on outdoor clay courts.

Past finals

Singles

Doubles

External links 
 
ITF Search

 
ATP Challenger Tour